Prometo  is the fourth studio album by Spanish singer-songwriter Pablo Alborán. It was announced on 9 October 2017 and released on 17 November 2017 through Warner Music Spain.

Background
In an interview with Billboard, Alborán explained the title as "...a promise to myself, to be honest to my emotions -- and at the same time, a promise to my fans. I promise to make music until death. On the other hand, I think that when you promise, you build up courage and maturity. We feel secure to fulfill that promise."

Reception
Amazon said "Alborán doesn't steer too far away with his unique voice and music styles from previous albums, however he does take some tracks to more up-beat tempos than we've heard from him in the past. The first two singles were released just a few weeks ago... [and] both have become some of the most played, viewed Latin pop songs in recent months and they have definitely set the stage for a strong album release." Nacho from Vibes of Silence gave the album 6.5 out of 10 saying there is "too much alternation between the ballads and more relaxed rhythms and the electronic and ethnic tints that some of the tracks have" but added  "Pablo always deliver[s]. He has a privileged voice, with an incredible facility to transmit emotions and a remarkable talent to compose." 

Prometo received nominations for a Grammy Award for Best Latin Pop Album and for the Album of the Year and Best Traditional Pop Vocal Album at the 19th Annual Latin Grammy Awards.

Singles 
 "Saturno" and "No Vaya a Ser" were released as the album's lead singles on 8 September 2017. 
 "Prometo" was released on 19 January 2018 as the album's third official single.

Promotional singles
 A "piano and string version" of "Prometo", "La llave" and "Al Paraíso" were released in October 2017 as promotional singles and pre-order tracks from the album.

Track listing

Charts

Weekly charts

Year-end charts

Certifications

Release history

References 

2017 albums
Pablo Alborán albums